Julie Halard-Decugis and Ai Sugiyama were the defending champions but did not compete that year.

Anna Kournikova and Barbara Schett won in the final 6–2, 7–5 against Lisa Raymond and Rennae Stubbs.

Seeds
Champion seeds are indicated in bold text while text in italics indicates the round in which those seeds were eliminated.

 Lisa Raymond /  Rennae Stubbs (final)
 Anna Kournikova /  Barbara Schett (champions)
 Lindsay Davenport /  Corina Morariu (quarterfinals)
 Amanda Coetzer /  Kimberly Po (semifinals)

Draw

Qualifying

Seeds
Both seeded teams received byes to the second round.
  Trudi Musgrave /  Bryanne Stewart (Qualifiers)
  Mariana Díaz Oliva /  María Vento (second round)

Qualifiers
  Trudi Musgrave /  Bryanne Stewart

Draw
 NB: The first two rounds used the pro set format.

References
 2001 Adidas International Women's Doubles Draw

Women's Doubles
2001 WTA Tour